Makhdoom Jamil uz Zaman is a Pakistani politician from Hala, Hyderabad District, Sindh, belonging to the Pakistan Peoples Party Parliamentarians. He is a member of the National Assembly of Pakistan. He became the spiritual leader of Sarwari Jamaat after the death of his father, Makhdoom Muhammad Amin Fahim, and was appointed the 19th caretaker of the Dargah Ghous ul Haq Hazrat Makhdoom Sarwar Nooh A.r.

Education and political career 
Jamil uz Zaman achieved has a Master of Arts degree. He started his political activities in 1981. He was minister for Inter-provincial co-ordination and chairman of the Sindhi Adabi board. Jamil uz Zaman served as the member of the Provincial Assembly of Sindh from 1997 to 2002 and 2002 to 2007. He was also the chairman of Talib-ul-Moula Academy, Standing Committee and Sindhi Adabi Board as a member of board of governors of the Institute of Sindhology at University of Sindh and board of governors at Sindhi Adabi Board.

Literary contributions 
 
 Mulakat (poetry)
 Subuhi (collection of poems)
 Uttar Luga Auo Pireen (poems)
 Mohabat Pai Man Main (poems / divan)
 Sindh ji Waqiati Tarikh (570 A.D to 1990 A.D) (chronological history)
 Tazkara-e-Makhdooman-e-Hala (history of the Makdooms of Hala)
 Ant-a-Mehboobi (collection of poems)
 Rooh-Ruchandiyon (poetry)
 Kafia Kosh (dictionary, under print)

References

External links
 

Living people
Sindhi people
Pakistan People's Party politicians
Sindh MPAs 2013–2018
People from Sindh
People from Matiari District
Makhdoom family
Pakistani MNAs 2018–2023
Year of birth missing (living people)